Zearing is an unincorporated community in Bureau County, Illinois, United States. Zearing is located along a railroad line southwest of Arlington.

Joseph R. Peterson (1904–1967), Illinois lawyer and state legislator, was born on a farm near Zearing.

References

Unincorporated communities in Bureau County, Illinois
Unincorporated communities in Illinois